To Linenize or Linenizing is the process transforming paper, cloth, cotton to attain properties of Linen, a textile made from flax plant fibers or Linens fabrics.  It may be thought of as the process of making another process imitate linen.  A product which has been processed to achieve linen-like properties is said to be linenized.

One method involves impressing a linen-like pattern onto the surface of paper, cloth or other malleable substance.

Linenizing is most frequently done on paper products and its use on paper products goes back to the early part of the 20th century.

Process

Paper
A paper roll is threaded between two hard rollers, usually made from steel. One or both of the steel rollers has a linen pattern engraved on it. As the nip pressure between the two hard rollers increases, the pattern from the engraved roller(s) is pressed into the paper. The result is a pattern that looks like a linen tablecloth or linen dress.  Various patterns and depths of those patterns have been developed throughout the years. Generally, the pattern is a series of vertical and horizontal lines with distances varying between those lines.

Resins
Resins from acrodies gum, produced from certain variants of the Xanthorrhoea plants species can be used for linenizing of the thinner qualities of paper.

Notes

References

Sources

Paper art
Pulp and paper industry
Linen industry